NBC Children's Theatre is an American television anthology series airing from November 3, 1963 to March 17, 1973.  Its stories were primarily drawn from classical and contemporary children's literature, including The Merry Adventures of Robin Hood and Stuart Little.

Narrators were Bill Cosby, Johnny Carson, Hugh Downs, and Burl Ives.  Actors included Fran Allison, Geraldine Page, James Earl Jones, Jonathan Winters, Tony Dow, Tim Matheson, and Sterling Holloway.

The show was nominated for four Primetime Emmys and won two Peabody Awards.

It is currently lost where the show hasn't been released on home video. Some of the episodes such as The World of Stuart Little and A Day with Bill Cosby had been found on collections or libraries such as The Paley Center for Media. The rest of the episodes are currently lost and only screenshots of them had surfaced.

References

External links

NBC Children's Theatre at Lost Media Wiki

1960s American anthology television series
1960s American children's television series
1970s American children's television series
1963 American television series debuts
1973 American television series endings
NBC original programming
American television shows featuring puppetry
1970s American anthology television series